Brackenbury Village is a residential district of west London between Goldhawk Road, King Street, Hammersmith Grove and Ravenscourt Park. It is named after Brackenbury Road in which there is a small parade of shops which form the heart of the self-styled village. There is a local magazine of the same name 'Brackenbury Village' that features local characters, history and businesses that give the area of Brackenbury Village its charming character. These businesses include The Andover Arms (Public House), Sisi's (Hardware & Ironmonger), Hepsibah (Gallery & Hatmaker), Stenton's (traditional Family Butchers) and Brackenbury Tailors (Tailors & Dry Cleaning). The name of the area came from estate agent descriptions, with houses in the area selling for over a million being seen regularly. The area has a private all-girl school, Godolphin and Latymer School, and two primary schools: Brackenbury Primary School and West London Free School Primary.

Famous residents include Jayne Hepsibah, Jonathan Powell and Mary Nightingale.

Brackenbury Village has a high proportion of residents burning wood.ref></ref>.

References

External links
Brackenbury Village
Brackenbury Residents Association
Brackenburys Delicatessen
Hepsibah Gallery
Community media

Areas of London
Districts of the London Borough of Hammersmith and Fulham